Jam Factory is a South Korean music publisher which sources song tunes and lyrics for K-pop, J-pop and Mandopop artists from songwriters predominantly based in the US. Writers of the tunes are often songwriters for American companies, such as Brandon Fraley, a well known provider of tunes to South Korean girl and boy bands, who is a songwriter for Sony Music Publishing in Los Angeles. Korean, Japanese and Chinese language lyrics are usually provided by Jam Factory's own lyricists based in Seoul.

As with the songwriters of America's Motown era Jam Factory's songwriters and lyricists may support a band's development over many years. For example, Girls' Generation songwriter team has included Korean lyricist Kim Hee-jeong for over 8 years, his lyrics growing with the band.

Personnel
American songwriters

 David Amber
 Joleen Belle
 Ron Boustead
 Kang Park
 Corey Cross
 Alyssa Degati
 Deanna Dellacioppa
 Brandon Fraley
 Jamelle Fraley
 Gary Haase
 John Paul Lam
 Michael Lee
 Greg Lynch
 Ashley Jana 
 Stefan Moeselle
 Sal Oliveri
 Reco
 Jay Saint
 Javier Solis
 Greg Stober
 Machan Tylor
 Joshua Welton
 Matt Zarley

British songwriters
 Ricky Hanley

Canadian songwriters
 Jessica Ridley
 Dan Somerville

German songwriters
 Simon Allert
 Andreas Bartels
 Florian Luettich
 Achim Radloff
 Rudger Schramm

Korean songwriters

 4 Miles
 Bang Yoon-jin
 Choi Young-shin
 Jose 
 Joy Factory
 Jung Hye-young
 Jung Jin-hwan
 Jung Young-ah
 Just
 Kim Hee-won
 Kim Hyun-joo
 Kim Lee-jin
 Kim Min-ji
 Kim Tae-yoon
 Ku Bon-young
 Kwak Jae-young
 Lee Eun-suk
 Lee Ho-min
 Lim Seung-hu
 Louie
 Min Yun-jae
 Park Jae-sik
 Park Joo-seung
 Park Kang-hyuk
 Park Ki-hyun
 Park Sang-il
 Redhead Anne
 Seo Ji-eum
 Seo Sung-hee
 Shin Hyung
 Shin Yo-han

L Diary
In January 2013, Jam Factory established L Diary Lyrics & Toplining Academy, where aspiring Korean songwriters could learn to write song lyrics and vocal melodies. Since then, L Diary has produced around 100 professional songwriters through over 40 songwriting camps where students are given the opportunity to write lyrics and toplines for prominent K-Pop artists.

L Diary instructors

 Seong Kyu-ho (Onetop)
 Shin Yo-han
 Hong Joon-seok (Jay)
 Park Seung-hee
 Kim Bo-eun
 Lee Do-yeon
 Cho Eun-hee
 Yoon Kyung (Joy Factory)
 Seo Seung-hee (Soulsweet)
 Kim Jin-ah
 Kim Min-ji
 Jung Young-ah
 Kim In-hyung
 Seo-ro
 Ku Tae-woo
 Shin Jin-hye
 Lee Seu-ran
 Seo Ji-eum
 Jung Jin-hwan

L Diary songwriters

 Bae Jin-young
 Bae Mi-hyun
 Bae Min-young
 Baek In-kyung (100% lyricism)
 Baek Min-kyung
 Bang Hye-hyun
 Bang Hye-hyung
 Bang Sung-hee
 Bong Eun-young
 Cho Soo-min
 Cho Yu-ri
 Choi Ah-reum
 Choi Hee-jae
 Choi Hye-ji
 Choi Ji-yeon
 Choi Jin-sun
 Choi So-young
 Choi Young-mi
 Gil Da-som
 Han Shin-hye
 Hwang Ji-won
 Hwang Seon-jeong (January 8 (lalala Studio))
 Hwang Yoo-ra
 Jang Han-bit
 Jang In-hyung
 Jang Jung-won
 Jang Yoon-ji
 Jeon Ji-eun (January 8 (lalala Studio))
 Ji Yu-ri
 Jivantika
 Jung Geu-roo (Jung Tree)
 Jung Hye-young
 Jung Hyung-ah
 Jung Il-lee
 Jung Jan-di (Kim Min-jung)
 Jung Jin-hwan
 Jung Joo-hee
 Jung Keu-roo
 Jung Min-ji
 Jung Mul-hwa
 Jung Yoon-hyuk
 Jung Yoon-seo
 Jung Young-ah (100% Lyricism)
 Kang Boo-young
 Kang Ji-eun
 Kang Ji-young
 Kim Bo-eun
 Kim Chae-lin
 Kim Eun-joo
 Kim Hee-jung
 Kim Hee-yeon
 Kim In-ha
 Kim In-hyung
 Kim Jae-won
 Kim Jeong-mi (January 8 (lalala Studio))
 Kim Ji-won
 Kim Jin-ah
 Kim Jung-eun (Jung Il-li)
 Kim Mi-ryang
 Kim Mi-young
 Kim Min-ji
 Kim Moon-sook
 Kim Ran
 Kim Soo-jin
 Kim Soo-yeon
 Kim Soo-young
 Kim Sung-woo
 Kim Woo-jung
 Kim Woo-sung
 Kim Yang-ha
 Ko Hyun-jung
 Ko Tae-woo
 Ku Tae-woo
 Kwon Da-jung
 Kwon Ho-geun
 Kyung Jin-hee
 Lee Chae-yoon
 Lee Chang-hyuk
 Lee Chang-hyun
 Lee Da-yoon
 Lee Eun-ok
 Lee Hye-ri
 Lee Hyo-min
 Lee Jae-sung
 Lee Jung-hyun
 Lee Makeunseul
 Lee Na-yeon
 Lee Se-wol
 Lee Seu-ran
 Lee Seul (Clear Dew)
 Lee Seul-gi
 Lee Seul-jae
 Lee Tae-geon
 Lee Yoo-jin
 Lee Yoon-seol
 Lim Ga-in
 Lim Jung-hyo
 Lim Soo-kyung
 Lim Yoo-jung
 Moon Hae-eun
 Moon Hye-min
 Moon Seol-ri
 Moon Yeo-reum
 Noh Yoon-seo
 Oh Min-joo
 Oh Seung-eun
 Oh Yoo-won
 Park Da-in
 Park Hye-hyun
 Park Hyong-joon
 Park Seong-hee
 Park So-hyun
 Park Yi-soo
 Park Yong-joon
 Ration
 Readhead Anne
 Ryu Da-som
 Seo Ji-eum
 Seo Min-ji (Seo-ro)
 Seo Seung-hee (Soulsweet & 100% lyricism)
 Seo-ro
 Seol Sung-min
 Seong Dan-young
 Shim Ha-yeon
 Shim Ha-young
 Shim Yoo-bin
 Shim Yoo-jin
 Shin Hye-sun
 Shin Jin-hye
 Song Carat (Baek Geum-min)
 Song Carat (Lee Soo-jung)
 Song Min-so
 U.F.O.
 Yoo Da-eun
 Yoo Eun-mi
 Yoon Sung-ji
 Yoon Kyung (Joy Factory)

Notable works

"You can stay here", "What is Love (With Young Yoon)", " Meet Anyone Lately ", "Flower Of The Universe", "Say Yes" - Ailes
"요즘 누구 만나 " - Aisle
" Does it make sense ", " Black and White " - ALi
"Heat", "Bing Bing", "I feel (Feeling)" - AOA
"Treasure",  니가 불어와 (Crazy Sexy Cool) " - Astro
"THE IDOLM @ STER" - B-Side
"운명" - Baek Z Young
"Think Hole" - B.A.P
"Always, All Ways" (Feat. Chancellor)" - BoA
"Easy" - Bastarz
"Obsession", " 핑 (Never End) " - Boyfriend
"I feel different the same night" - Vromance
"Stars", "Please love me", "I'll cry", "사랑은 이제 그만", "Cherry fly." , "I do love doing it and laughed.", "What is love" - Bubble Sisters
"Remember Today" - Bubble Sisters, Soulman 
"Mi Amor" - CocoSori
"Love is You", "Fall in love", "When this song ends" - Dae-Kwang Hong
"Rainbow (With Kids)" - DJ IT
"Deja Vu", "Mayday", "Wake Up", "Good Night", "Chase Me" - Dreamcatcher
"Your name" - El Tuwai (L2Y)
"Black Pearl", "Don't Go", "Overdose", "Moonlight", "Run", "Love, Love, Love", "Call Me Baby", "What If...", "El Dorado", "Hurt", "Beautiful", "Love Me Right", "On the Snow", "Lightsaber" (Bonus Track), "White Noise", "One and Only", "Stronger", "Lotto", "Falling for You", "Twenty Four", "Winter Heat", "Chill", "Walk On Memories", "Love Me Right (Romantic Universe)", "With You", "Bad Dream", "Damage", "Wait", "Butterfly Effect", "Runaway" - Exo
"Juliet" , "Lazy"- Exo-CBX
"4 Walls" - f(x)
"Lazy Girl (Dolce Far Niente)", "Lion Heart", "Paradise", "Girls Are Back", "Only One" - Girls' Generation
"Lil' Touch", "Fermata" - Girls' Generation-Oh!GG
"Twinkle" - Girls' Generation-TTS
"I focused on the mouth and then", "Two Faces", "bracket (Bracket)", "go out" - Gray Day
"Not That Type", "Shotgun", "Lovesick" - Gugudan
"Snack Song" - Haesol
"Badster" - Hyo
" 자화상 " - HyunA
" Propose " - In Been
"Alive" - J-Min
"You are brilliant" - Jinho
"Shine" - Jin-Woon Jeong
"Because of You" - Joo-hyun park
"walking on the moon" - Jun. K
"I Wanna Be" (Feat. Soyeon of (G)I-dle) - Key
"The Wanted" - Klang
"살랑살랑" - Limd
"All night (Feat. Kim Do-yeon of Weki Meki)"
"8dayz" - Megan Lee
" 야간비행", "Lovely Day" - Miles
"Fighter", " X " - Monsta X
"짜장면" - Myteen
"I'm So Pretty", "SHUT UP!", "Thumb (You'll Be Mine)", "constellation (La Historia)", "Allegro Cantabile (By Your Side)" - Nature
"Shooting Star (I'm You)"- Newkidd
"Fire Truck", "Another World", "Heartbreaker", "Back 2 U (AM 01:27)", "Cherry Bomb", "0 Mile", "Sun&Moon", "Summer 127", "Replay (PM 01:27)", "Knock On", "Come Back", "Touch", "Superhuman", "Paper Plane", "Love Song", "White Night", "Dreams Come True", "Make Your Day", "Focus", "The Rainy Night", "Dreamer", "Love on the Floor", "Earthquake" - NCT 127
"The 7th Sense", "Yestoday", "Yestoday (Extended Version)(Bonus Track)", "Dancing In The Rain", "Déjà Vu", "Faded In My Last Song", "All About You", "Round&Round" - NCT U
"Trigger the fever (Bonus Track)", "Beautiful Time", "Drippin'", "Dear DREAM", "Boom", "119", "Bye My First...", "Dream Run", "Ridin'", "Quiet Down", "Love Again", "Hot Sauce", "My Youth", "Countdown (3, 2, 1)", "Life Is Still Going On", "Dreaming" - NCT Dream
"Crime Scene", "Checkmate" - Oh My Girl 
"Shooting Star" - P-38
" 누가 날 불러 ", "Who" - Pair Soul
"I want to ..." - Pre-Melo
" Hands on me " - Produce 101 (season 2)
"To My World" - Produce X 101
" I Must Go! " - Real Girls Project
"Attention" - Red Queen
"Would U", "Automatic", "Dumb Dumb", "Oh Boy", "Don't U Wait No More", "One of These Nights", "Sunny Afternoon", "Fool", "Little Little", "Happily Ever After", "Talk To Me", "You Better Know", "Zoo", "Kingdom Come", "About Love", "All Right", "With You", "Mosquito", "Blue Lemonade" "So Good", "Taste", "Milkshake", "Bing Bing", "Parade", "LP", "Zimzalabim", "Love Is the Way", "Remember Forever", "Pose", "Knock on Wood", "Better Be", "Feel My Rhythm", "Rainbow Halo" - Red Velvet
"I can think of anything (Sung by Aisle x Ahn Seung-hoon)", "31-28 (Sung by Aisle x CUDDY)" - Replay no.36 owl
"Advisory is" - Roy Kim
"Without You" - Ryeowook
"Thinking Alcohol", "Night Coffee", "The farewells we encountered", "Hello, see you tomorrow", "Pink Dolphin", " 좋아 (Better Than Some) (Feat. Puddy) " - Seunghun Ahn
"Take It On", "Nothing Better", "Searchlight", "Heal Me" - Seven O'Clock (band)
"Hush" - SES
"Zero gravity", "SHADOW", "Never Registered Say Goodbye", "Be My Baby", "Midnight Road", "4 Step", "Jungle Game" - SF9
"I Want You", "Drive" - Shinee
" 아야 " - S.I.S
"Drama", "Happy", "Slow longer", "You & the I", "Sad lies", "Possessed", "Sketch" - Soul Sweet
"My style" - Soul Sweet, Hannah (Rememberers)
 "Some" - Soyou, Junggigo
" 보고싶어 " - Sung-Ri Kim
"Game", "Me & U", " Black Suit ", " Good Day for a Good Day ", " 예뻐 보여 (Girlfriend) ", " I do (두 번째 고백) " - Super Junior
"RUM DEE DEE", "summer night (I love it)", "Livin` In" - Super Junior-D&E
"Jopping", "the Super the Car", "No Manners" - SuperM
"Shadow", " Love ", " Labyrinth (Stone Heart) ", " Rise (Icarus) " - Taemin
 "Gemini", "Starlight", "Fashion", "Up & Down", "Good Thing", "Something New", "Curtain Call" , "Feel So Fine", "Love in Colo)", "Eraser", "Find Me", "Dear Me", "Playlist", "Can't Control Myself" - Taeyeon
"Road" - TRAX
"Island", "WOLF BABY", " Don`t Stop The Dancing ", " 0 (Young) " - TRCNG
" YESMAN ", "Without You" - TST
"Truth", "Love Line", "Puzzle" (Sung By U-Know)", "Closer" (Sung By Max), "Bounce" - TVXQ
"Dance The Night Away", "Shadow" - Twice
"Hit Me Up (Feat.Giriboy )", " Blue Jeans - U-Know
"Steal Your Heart" - UNIT BLACK
" 경리단길 ", " 이별부자 (Feat. 조준호) " - Ukulele Picnic
"Blue Rose", "CANDYLAND" - Up10tion
"PARALLEL", "Shangri La(桃源 境)" - VIXX
"Turn Back Time (Korean Version)", "Kick Back (Korean Version)" - WayV
"퐁당퐁당 (Plop Plop)" - WJSN
"Gift" - Woo-Hyuk Min
"One For Ya" (Feat. Hash Swan) - XION
"Fly (Bunji Jump)" - Yesung
"Sad lies", "Please love me" - Yi-Joon Park
" 너와 같은 하루 ", " 우산 쓴 사람 " - Young-Bae Cho
" 추억시계 " - Young Ji-Heo, Kara
"Fortune Cookie" - Young-Eun Seo
"dB (Decibels)" - Young Yoon
"Into You", "Dream" - Yuri
"My World" - Zea
"ZONK", "Dust (DUST)" - ZYEUN

References

Music publishing companies of South Korea